KZUA (92.1 FM, "Z92") is a commercial radio station in Holbrook, Arizona, United States. It is owned by Petracom of Holbrook, LLC (a subsidiary of Petracom Media). The station broadcasts a country music format to Northeast Arizona. In January 2011, KZUA began simulcasting on KZUZ (93.5 FM Show Low)

External links
 KZUA Website

ZUA
Country radio stations in the United States
Holbrook, Arizona
Mass media in Navajo County, Arizona